Eudemopsis is a genus of moths belonging to the subfamily Olethreutinae of the family Tortricidae.

Species
Eudemopsis albopunctata Liu & Bai, 1982
Eudemopsis brevis Liu & Bai, 1982
Eudemopsis flexis Liu & Bai, 1982
Eudemopsis heteroclita Liu & Bai, 1982
Eudemopsis kirishimensis Kawabe, 1974
Eudemopsis polytrichia Liu & Bai, 1985
Eudemopsis pompholycias (Meyrick, in Caradja & Meyrick, 1935)
Eudemopsis purpurissatana (Kennel, 1901)
Eudemopsis ramiformis Liu & Bai, 1982
Eudemopsis tokui Kawabe, 1974
Eudemopsis toshimai Kawabe, 1974

See also
List of Tortricidae genera

References

External links
tortricidae.com

Tortricidae genera
Olethreutinae